Damian van Bruggen (born 18 March 1996) is a Dutch professional footballer who plays for Almere City. Mainly a central defender, he can also play as a defensive midfielder or a full-back.

Club career 
Van Bruggen moved from Almere City to the AFC Ajax youth academy at the start of the 2011–12 season. In March 2013, Van Bruggen signed his first professional contract with Ajax, at the age of 16.

Van Bruggen made his professional debut for Jong Ajax as a 61st-minute substitute for Ricardo van Rhijn in an Eerste Divisie match against Fortuna Sittard on 16 August 2014.

He moved on a season-long loan to Eredivisie club VVV-Venlo in August 2017.

Career statistics

References

External links
 
 
Netherlands profile

1996 births
Living people
Footballers from Utrecht (city)
Dutch footballers
Netherlands youth international footballers
Netherlands under-21 international footballers
Association football defenders
Eerste Divisie players
Eredivisie players
Croatian Football League players
Slovenian PrvaLiga players
Jong Ajax players
Jong PSV players
VVV-Venlo players
NK Inter Zaprešić players
NK Slaven Belupo players
NK Olimpija Ljubljana (2005) players
Almere City FC players
Dutch expatriate footballers
Expatriate footballers in Croatia
Expatriate footballers in Slovenia
Dutch expatriate sportspeople in Croatia
Dutch expatriate sportspeople in Slovenia